John George Metras  (August 29, 1940 – June 30, 2020) was a Canadian football player who played for the Hamilton Tiger-Cats. He won the Grey Cup with them in 1965. He previously played football at the University of Western Ontario, where his father Johnny Metras coached. His father was later inducted into the Canadian Football Hall of Fame in 1980 as a builder. John Metras, Jr. was inducted into the Western Ontario Wall of Champions  in 2013. He later worked as a lawyer. Metras died on June 30, 2020.

References

1940 births
Western Mustangs football players
Hamilton Tiger-Cats players
2020 deaths